Route 312 is a collector road in the Canadian province of Nova Scotia.

It is located in Victoria County and connects Englishtown at Highway 105 with River Bennet at Trunk 30 (the Cabot Trail).

Communities
South Haven
Englishtown
Jersey Cove
River Bennett

See also
List of Nova Scotia provincial highways

References

Map of Nova Scotia

Nova Scotia provincial highways
Roads in Victoria County, Nova Scotia